Messier 89 (M89 for short, also known as NGC 4552) is an elliptical galaxy in the constellation Virgo. It was discovered by Charles Messier on March 18, 1781. M89 is a member of the Virgo Cluster of galaxies.

Features

Current observations allow the possibility that M89 may be nearly perfectly spherical. Distinct flattening as ellipsoids is found in all easily measurable comparators up to a few times of its distance. The alternative explanation is that it is an ellipsoid oriented so that it appears spherical to an observer on Earth.

The galaxy features a surrounding structure of gas and dust, extending up to 150,000 light-years and jets of heated particles up to two-thirds of that. This indicates that it may have once been an active quasar or radio galaxy. M89 has an extensive and complex system of surrounding shells and plumes, indicating that it has seen one or several notable mergers.

Chandra studies in the wavelength of the X-Rays show two ring-like structures of hot gas in M89's nucleus, suggesting an outburst there 1 to 2 million years ago as well as ram-pressure stripping acting on the galaxy as it moves through Virgo's intracluster medium.

M89 also has a large array of globular clusters. A 2006 survey estimates that there are 2,000 ± 700 of these within 25′. This compares to 150 to 200 of these thought (among which many proven) to surround the Milky Way.

Gallery

See also
 List of Messier objects

References

External links 
 
 SEDS: Messier Object 89
 

Messier 089
Messier 089
Messier 089
089
Messier 089
07760
41968
Astronomical objects discovered in 1781
Discoveries by Charles Messier